Hoffmann is a German surname.

People

A
Albert Hoffmann (1846–1924), German horticulturist
Alexander Hoffmann (born 1975), German politician
Arthur Hoffmann (politician) (1857–1927), Swiss politician and member of the Swiss Federal Council
Asa Hoffmann (born 1943), American chess player
August Heinrich Hoffmann von Fallersleben (1798–1874), German poet

B
Banesh Hoffmann (1906–1986), American mathematician and physicist, biographer of Einstein
Baptist Hoffmann (1863–1937), German operatic baritone and voice teacher
Bettina Hoffmann (born 1960), German politician
Bruno Hoffmann (1913–1991), German glass harp player

C
Charles F. Hoffmann (1838–1913), German-American topographer
Christoph Hoffmann (1815–1885), German politician and Templer
Christoph Hoffmann (born 1957), German politician

D
David Hoffmann (disambiguation)

E
E. T. A. Hoffmann (Ernst Theodor Amadeus Hoffmann; 1776–1822), German writer, eponym of The Tales of Hoffmann
Erich Hoffmann (1868–1959), German dermatologist
Ernst Hoffmann (conductor) (1899–1956), American symphony conductor

F
Falk Hoffmann (born 1952), East German diver
Felix Hoffmann (1868–1949), German chemist (aspirin)
Felix Hoffmann (basketball) (born 1989), German basketball player
Felix Hoffmann (illustrator) (1911–1975), Swiss graphic designer and artist
Francis Hoffmann (1822–1903), German-American clergyman, politician and writer
Frederic de Hoffmann (1924–1989), Austrian-American nuclear physicist
Friedrich Hoffmann (1660–1742), German physician and chemist at Halle
Friedrich Albin Hoffmann (1843–1924), German internist
Fritz Hoffmann-La Roche (1868–1920), Swiss founder of chemical company

G
Gaby Hoffmann (born 1982), American actress
Geza von Hoffmann (1885–1921), Austrian-Hungarian eugenicist and writer
Georg Franz Hoffmann (1760–1826), German botanist and lichenologist
Gerhard Hoffmann (pilot) (1919–1945), World War II German flying ace
Gleisi Hoffmann, Brazilian politician and lawyer

H
Hanna Hoffmann (1858–1917), Danish sculptor and silversmith
Hans Hoffmann (painter) (c.1530–1592), German artist
Heinrich Hoffmann (author) (1809–1894), German psychiatrist and author
Heinrich Hoffmann (sport shooter) (1867–?), German sports shooter
Heinrich Hoffmann (photographer) (1885–1957), German photographer
Heinrich Hoffmann (pilot) (1913–1941), World War II German flying ace 
Heinz Hoffmann (1910–1985), East German General and Defence Minister
Hermann Hoffmann (1819–1891), German botanist and mycologist
Hilmar Hoffmann (1925–2018), German film festival director, cultural politician, director of Goethe-Institute, writer

I
Ingo Hoffmann (born 1953), Brazilian Formula One & Two racecar driver

J
James Hoffmann (born 1979), English barista, businessman and online influencer 
Jan Hoffmann (born 1955), German figure skater
Jens Hoffmann (born 1974), Costa Rican writer and curator of exhibitions
Joachim Hoffmann (1930–2002), German historian
Johann Hoffmann (neurologist) (1857–1919), German neurologist
Johann Joseph Hoffmann (1805–1878), German scholar and Oriental philologist
Johann Leonard Hoffmann (1710–1782), Dutch army surgeon and amateur geologist
Johannes Hoffmann (1867–1930), Bavarian politician and Minister-President
John-Baptist Hoffmann (1857–1928), German Jesuit, anthropologist and Munda scholar
Jörg Hoffmann (swimmer) (born 1970), German swimmer
Josef Hoffmann (1870–1956), Austrian architect and designer
Jules A. Hoffmann (born 1941), Luxembourg-born French immunologist and Nobel laureate

K
Karel Hoffmann (1872–1936), Czech violinist
Karl Hoffmann (Swiss politician) (1820–1895)
Karl August Otto Hoffmann (1853–1909), German botanist
Karol Hoffmann (born 1989), Polish athlete
Kurt-Caesar Hoffmann (1895–1988), German admiral during World War II

L
Leonard Hoffmann, Baron Hoffmann (born 1934), British Law Lord
Luc Hoffmann (1923–2016), Swiss ornithologist, co-founder of the World Wildlife Fund

M
Mat Hoffman (born 1972), American BMX rider
Max Hoffmann (1869–1927), German officer and military strategist during World War I
Melanie Hoffmann (born 1974), German footballer
Mike Hoffmann (1953/1954–2021), American musician and record producer
Marcin Hoffmann (born 1972), Polish professor of chemistry at Adam Mickiewicz University

N
Nickel Hoffmann (1536–1592), German architect

O
Oskar Hoffmann (painter) (1851–1912), Baltic-German artist from Estonia
Oskar Hoffmann (author) (1866–1928), German science fiction author

P
Philipp Hoffmann (1806–1889), German architect
Professor Hoffmann (1839–1919}, pseudonym for Angelo Lewis, English barrister, magician and writer

R
Ralph Hoffmann (1870–1932), American ornithologist
Reinhild Hoffmann (born 1943), German choreographer
Roald Hoffmann (born 1937), Polish-American chemist and Nobel laureate
Roy Hoffmann, US Navy Rear Admiral
Rüdiger Hoffmann (born 1964), German cabarettist

T
 Thorsten Hoffmann (born 1961), German politician

Z
Zdzisław Hoffmann (born 1959), Polish triple jumper

Other uses 
 Hoffmann (motorcycle), defunct German bicycle and motorcycle manufacturer
 Hoffmann (automobile), German three-wheeled car

See also 
 Hoffman
 Hofman
 Hofmann
 Johann Centurius Hoffmannsegg (author abbreviation: Hoffmanns., 1766–1849), a German botanist and entomologist

German-language surnames
Occupational surnames
Jewish surnames